Below is a List of Dames Grand Cross of the Order of the British Empire from the Order's creation in 1917 until the present day:

List

1930s
1931: The Marchioness of Aberdeen and Temair
1932: The Baroness Baden-Powell, The Viscountess Cowdray 
1937: The Countess of Athlone, The Countess Baldwin of Bewdley, The Duchess of Gloucester, The Duchess of Kent, Enid Lyons 
1938: The Marchioness of Carisbrooke

1940s
1944: The Dowager Marchioness of Reading
1946: Clementine Churchill, Isobel Cripps
1948: The Countess Mountbatten of Burma, Beryl Oliver

1950s
1951: The Baroness Denman
1953: The Baroness Freyberg
1954: The Countess Alexander of Tunis, Pattie Menzies, The Countess of Limerick, The Baroness Horsbrugh
1957: Dehra Parker

1960s
1961: The Baroness Sharp
1964: Lady Dorothy Macmillan

1980s
1983: The Baroness Donaldson of Lymington

2000s
2005: The Baroness Butler-Sloss

2010s
2012: The Baroness Hayman
2019: The Baroness Higgins

2020s
2022: Dame Sue Ion
2023: Dame Hermione Lee

See also
 List of Dames Commander of the Order of the British Empire
 List of Knights Grand Cross of the Order of the British Empire

References

Dames Grand Cross of the Order of the British Empire
British Empire